Morphaneflus prolixus is a species of beetle in the family Cerambycidae, the only species in the genus Morphaneflus.

References

Elaphidiini